Santa Cruz de Succhubamba is a town in northern Peru, capital of Santa Cruz Province in Cajamarca Region.

Populated places in the Cajamarca Region